William Vincent Cahill (1878-1924) was an American painter and art educator.

Life
Cahill was born in 1878 in Syracuse, New York. He studied at the Art Students League of New York.

Cahill first became in Boston, where he shared a studio with John Hubbard Rich until 1914, when he moved to California. He taught art in Laguna Beach, Pasadena and Hollywood, and he exhibited his work at the California Art Club and the Los Angeles County Museum of Art. He taught at the University of Kansas for a year, and later moved his studio to Chicago.

Cahill married Katherine Kavanaugh. He died in 1924 in Chicago. His work can be seen at the Laguna Art Museum.

References

1878 births
1924 deaths
Art Students League of New York alumni
Artists from Los Angeles
Artists from Chicago
American male painters
20th-century American painters
20th-century American male artists